is the ninth Neptune trojan discovered. It was first observed on 29 April 2011, during the New Horizons KBO Search  using the Magellan II (Clay) Telescope at Las Campanas Observatory in Chile. It has the same orbital period as Neptune and orbits at the  Lagrangian point about 60° backwards of Neptune.

Orbit and classification 

Neptune trojans are resonant trans-Neptunian objects (TNO) in a 1:1 mean-motion orbital resonance with Neptune. These Trojans have a semi-major axis (a) very similar Neptune's (30.10 AU).

 orbits the Sun with a semi-major axis of 30.219 AU at a distance of 27.7–32.8 AU once every 166 years and 1 month (60,675 days). Its orbit has an eccentricity of 0.08 and an inclination of 29° with respect to the ecliptic. Among the first 17 Neptune trojans discovered so far, it is the one with the highest inclination.

Physical properties

Diameter and albedo 

Based on a generic magnitude-to-diameter conversion, it measures approximately 100 kilometers in diameter using an absolute magnitude of 8.1 and an assumed albedo of 0.10. It is an averaged-sized body among the first 17 Neptune trojans discovered so far, which measure between 60 and 200 kilometers (for an absolute magnitude of 9.3–6.6 and an assumed albedo of 0.10).

Numbering and naming 

Due to its orbital uncertainty, this minor planet has not been numbered and its official discoverers have not been determined. If named, it will follow the naming scheme already established with 385571 Otrera, which is to name these objects after figures related to the Amazons, an all-female warrior tribe that fought in the Trojan War on the side of the Trojans against the Greek.

Exploration

In October 2012,  was the closest known object of any kind to the New Horizons spacecraft. The New Horizons team eventually decided that they would not target  for observations because the preparations for the Pluto approach took precedence.

See also
List of New Horizons topics

References

External links 
 A. Parker – : A new companion for Neptune – TPS
 MPEC 2012-T05 : 
 YouTube video showing the orbital evolution
 Discoverer comments
 AstDyS-2 about 
 
 

Minor planet object articles (unnumbered)

20110429